The Avid Champion is an American single-seat, high-wing ultralight aircraft that was produced starting in 1998 as a kit by Avid Aircraft of Caldwell, Idaho, later Ennis, Montana.

Avid Aircraft went out of business in November 2003 and the aircraft kits are no longer available.

Development
The Champion was created by scaling down the Avid Mark IV and narrowing the wider fuselage into a single seat design intended to comply with the US FAR 103 Ultralight Vehicles category.

The design is a conventional tractor configuration, featuring tube and aircraft fabric construction. The main landing gear is bungee suspended and includes a steerable tailwheel. Like other Avid designs, the wing has an under-cambered airfoil, Junkers style ailerons and scalloped trailing edges. The wing can be folded for storage and the aircraft can be towed on its wheels behind a car. The wing folding mechanism does not include automatic connecting ailerons. Two door options were originally available, a Piper J-3 Cub-style horizontally split door or an overhead-hinged door.

When the kit was available, the company did not provide an engine for it, leaving the choice of engines and compliance with FAR 103 restrictions up to the owner. The aircraft qualifies as an amateur-built in many countries including the US and Canada.

Building time to complete the kit was reported by the company to be 160 hours. When the aircraft was introduced in 1998, the kit cost was US$8995, without an engine. Complete airframes, also without an engine, were available for US$12,995.

Operational history
Andre Cliche's flight review of the Champion describes it as "light and responsive" and "agile", but cautions that the Junkers full-span ailerons produce high roll rates and high adverse yaw. He also indicated that "the overall responsiveness and taildragger reactions might tax beginners' capabilities."

Jim Bethea of UltraFlight magazine said: "The Champion is arguably the best fixed-wing ultralight available and perhaps the most overlooked."

With the Rotax 447 engine, the aircraft can take-off in under , as one owner explained: "You'd better be ready when you advance the throttle because the plane will jump off the ground within the next three seconds!" Landings in crosswinds have been described as "easy with a forward slip and touchdown on one main wheel". A full rudder slip will produce a descent rate of 2000 feet per minute (10 m/s).

Because the choice of engine installed was left up to the builder, a variety of engines has been used, including the Rotax 277, 447 and the  Rotax 503.

Specifications (Champion with Rotax 277)

See also

References

Champion
1990s United States ultralight aircraft
Aircraft first flown in 1998